Bushbury railway station was a railway station opened by the London and North Western Railway on 2 August 1852. It served the  Bushbury area of Wolverhampton, and near to the junction of Showell Road and Bushbury Lane.

The station was located within the Bushbury Junction complex, and was between the Grand Junction line to Wednesfield Heath and the later Stour Valley Line to Wolverhampton High Level; and just to the north of the connecting line to Wolverhampton Low Level.

The station closed in 1912.

References
West Midlands Local Transport Plan Corridor U study (PDF)
Wolverhampton History and Heritage Society: Bushbury in the 19th Century

Disused railway stations in Wolverhampton
Railway stations in Great Britain opened in 1852
Railway stations in Great Britain closed in 1912
1852 establishments in England
Former London and North Western Railway stations